Once on the Rhine is a 1952 West German comedy drama film directed by Helmut Weiss and starring Maria Paudler, Jupp Hussels, and Paul Henckels. It was shot at the Wiesbaden Studios in Hesse and on location Rüdesheim and Eltville in the Rhineland. The film's sets were designed by the art director Rudolf Pfenninger. Part of the heimatfilm genre, it takes its name from a popular song. It was distributed by the German branch of the Rank Organisation.

Synopsis
A widower with three daughters buys a hotel on the banks of the River Rhine.

Cast

References

Bibliography

External links 
 

1952 films
1952 comedy-drama films
German comedy-drama films
West German films
1950s German-language films
Films directed by Helmut Weiss
German black-and-white films
1950s German films